A geo-fence warrant (also known as a geofence warrant or a reverse location warrant) is a search warrant issued by a court to allow law enforcement to search a database to find all active mobile devices within a particular geo-fence area. Courts have granted law enforcement geo-fence warrants to obtain information from databases such as Google's Sensorvault, which collects users' historical geolocation data. Geo-fence warrants are a part of a category of warrants known as reverse search warrants.

History 
Geo-fence warrants were first used in 2016. Google reported that it had received 982 such warrants in 2018, 8,396 in 2019, and 11,554 in 2020. A 2021 transparency report showed that 25% of data requests from law enforcement to Google were geo-fence data requests. Google is the most common recipient of geo-fence warrants and the main provider of such data, although companies including Apple, Snapchat, Lyft, and Uber have also received such warrants.

Legality

United States 
Some lawyers and privacy experts believe reverse search warrants are unconstitutional under the Fourth Amendment to the United States Constitution, which protects people from unreasonable searches and seizures, and requires any search warrants be specific to what and to whom they apply. The Fourth Amendment specifies that warrants may only be issued "upon probable cause, supported by Oath or affirmation, and particularly describing the place to be searched, and the persons or things to be seized." Some lawyers, legal scholars, and privacy experts have likened reverse search warrants to general warrants, which were made illegal by the Fourth Amendment.

Groups including the Electronic Frontier Foundation have opposed geofence warrants in amicus briefs filed in motions to quash such orders to disclose geofence data.

See also
 Dragnet (policing)

References

Geographic position
Internet privacy
Google
Databases
Warrants
Law enforcement terminology
Searches and seizures